Richard Thomas Legh, 5th Baron Newton (born 11 January 1950) is a Baron in the United Kingdom.

Family

Legh is the son of the  Conservative politician, Peter Legh, MP for Petersfield from 1951 until he succeeded to the barony in 1960. In 1978 he married  Rosemary Whitfoot Clarke, younger daughter of Herbert Clarke: they had one son and one daughter. Legh succeeded his father in 1992.

Education
Legh was educated at Eton and Christ Church, Oxford.

Career
He was a solicitor at  May May & Merrimans from 1976 to 1979; and a  General Commissioner for Income Tax from 1983. He was a Member of Wealden District Council from 1987 to 1999; and a member of the Sussex Downs Conservation Board from  1992 to 1998.

Arms

References 

1950 births
Living people
English solicitors
Barons in the Peerage of the United Kingdom
People educated at Eton College
Alumni of Christ Church, Oxford
People from Wealden District

Newton